Line 32 of the Shenzhen Metro is a line under planning, which will run entirely in Dapeng New District from Xichong at the terminus of Line 8 to the town of Kuichong for approximately 9.5 kilometers. Construction is planned to begin in 2023.

History & Route Alignment Schemes
Line 32 first appeared in the "Shenzhen Metro Masterplan (2016-2030)" announced on December 29, 2016. In the plan, the line starts from Xiaomeisha station, turns south at Kuichong, passes through Dapeng, Nan'ao and other places before ending at Xinda station, with a total length of 29.4 kilometers. The initial plan is expected to use BYD cloud rail technology to build a straddle monorail line.

On April 6, 2021, construction of the third phase of Line 8 was implemented, extending from Xiaomeisha eastward to Xichong. The starting point of Line 32 was also changed to Xichong station. At the same time, the Shenzhen-Huizhou Intercity Railway has also added a Dapeng branch line with its terminal at Xinda station, which to a certain extent replaced the Kuichong-Xinda section of the line; this line has also been changed to a horizontal connection line and the distance has been greatly reduced.

On August 26, 2022, the "Shenzhen Metro Phase V Expansion Plan (2023-2028)" was officially announced, and Line 32 has been included in it. There are 2 schemes. Both schemes will start at Xichong and end at Kuichong East. The full underground scheme has a total length of about 9.4 kilometers and 3 stations. The total length of the elevated scheme is about 9.5 kilometers, and there are 5 stations. Except for Xichong station, the others are elevated stations.

Stations (Scheme 1)

Stations (Scheme 2)

References

Shenzhen Metro lines
Transport infrastructure under construction in China